P.L. Deshpande garden is a project initiated by the Pune Municipal Corporation.
It covers 12 acres of land, and is also known as the Japanese Garden.
It is located on Sinhgad Road, in Pune, Maharashtra.

See also
 Pune-Okayama Friendship Garden

References

Parks in Pune